East Hamilton High School is a public school located in Ooltewah, Tennessee. Established and opened in 2009, it was originally a "middle high school" that enrolled students from grades 6–12. In December 2020, the new East Hamilton Middle School opened and East Hamilton Middle High School became just East Hamilton High School. Now students in grades 6-8 attend the new East Hamilton Middle School, and students in grades 9-12 attend East Hamilton High School. Both schools also now have separate school web addresses. The principal of East Hamilton High School is currently Brent Eller.

References

2009 establishments in Tennessee
Educational institutions established in 2009
Schools in Hamilton County, Tennessee
Public high schools in Tennessee
Public middle schools in Tennessee